John Thomas Annear (3 June 1842 – 28 May 1910) was a politician in Queensland, Australia. He was a Member of the Queensland Legislative Assembly and a Member of the Queensland Legislative Council.

Politics
John Annear was the member for Maryborough in the Legislative Assembly of Queensland from 1884 to 1902 and a member of the Queensland Legislative Council from 1902 until his death in 1910.

Later life
John Annear died on 28 May 1910. He was buried in Toowong Cemetery.

References

1842 births
1910 deaths
Members of the Queensland Legislative Assembly
Members of the Queensland Legislative Council
Place of birth missing
Burials at Toowong Cemetery